Blackbox is an indie puzzle game developed and designed by Ryan McLeod, with sound design by Gus Callahan. In Blackbox, the player solves puzzles by discovering and exploring the device's hardware and operating system; rarely do solutions involve touch mechanics. As the player progresses more puzzles are unlocked. Blackbox won a 2017 Apple Design Award for innovation and excellence in design and accessibility and was recognized as a 2018 Webby Award Honoree in the Puzzle and Best Visual Design categories. It has also won a Golden Apple from Apple Vis (an online community of blind and low-vision Apple product users) as  “Best iOS Game” for 2017.

Gameplay 
In Blackbox, players attempt to turn on “lights” by solving their associated challenge. Once a challenge is solved its light is turned on permanently. Lights are displayed on a “home grid” and are grouped in sets by challenge type (each represented by a unique color). Each set of challenges has a unique minimalistic visual and sonic representation that helps player understand and solve its puzzles. The game's grid and non-linear level sequence let players of varying skill and thinking styles to play and explore at their own pace. Each challenge has hints of varying degrees of helpfulness that can be revealed using an in game currency of hint credits which can be bought or earned in different ways. Blackbox is free to download, includes 53 free challenges, and two paid expansion packs (the “Erudite Pack” which includes 11 challenges, and the “Push Pack” which includes 8).

Development 
Blackbox was developed over 12 months beginning in late 2014 by Ryan McLeod. Its visual style was inspired by indie games such as Threes, Monument Valley, Letterpress, and Grow. Its puzzles were inspired by indie apps and games Machinarium, Fez, Braid, Portal, Limbo, Hatch, Clear, Peek, and Inception as well as augmented real world games, geocaching, and physical puzzles. After a closed beta test, it was released for iOS on February 25, 2016; the game is under active development with new puzzles and features added regularly.

Reception 
The game received favorable reviews from critics and players. Reviewers found the game “unlike anything”, “devilishly clever”, and “utterly diabolical” with many noting its novel breadth of mechanics using device sensors and system features. The game has received over 90,000 five-star reviews on the iOS App Store worldwide. It won a 2017 Apple Design Award, was named a Breakthrough Moment in Gaming, and was downloaded over 4.0 million times as of July 2017.

External links 
 
 Developer website

References 

2016 video games
IOS games
IOS-only games
Puzzle video games
Single-player video games